Chandab (also Romanized as Chandāb; also known as Gondā (Persian: گندا) and Gandāb) is a village in Eyvanki Rural District, Eyvanki District, Garmsar County, Semnan Province, Iran. At the 2006 census, its population was 425, in 96 families.

References 

Populated places in Garmsar County